Konpira Gongen (金毘羅権現) is a Japanese god of the Shugendō sect originating in the mountain Kotohira of Kagawa Prefecture. He is the god of merchant sailors.

See also
Shinbutsu-shūgō
Honji suijaku
Kotohira-gū
Emperor Sutoku

References 

Japanese religious terminology
Japanese gods
Gongen
Tengu
Vaiśravaṇa